Brian Fairlie (born 13 June 1948), is a retired tennis player from New Zealand. During his career from 1968 to 1979, he won four titles in doubles, all with the Egyptian player Ismail El Shafei, and 10 singles titles in the Open era (and at least two more in 1967).

Playing career

Juniors
Fairlie was the 1967 Boys' Singles champion of the Australian Championships.

Professional
Fairlie's best result in a Grand Slam was reaching the semi-finals of men's doubles at the French Open in 1971 with partner Frew McMillan. A year earlier, he reached the singles quarterfinals of the U.S. Open, losing to Tony Roche.

While his highest ATP singles ranking was World No. 24 (in September 1973), Fairlie was ranked inside the world's Top 20 in the late 1960s and early 1970s.

In 1969, his first full year on the circuit, he upset former Wimbledon and U.S. Open champion John Newcombe in the quarterfinals of the Heineken Open in Auckland. The tournament's website describes the atmosphere at the event that year: "There was wild excitement in a packed stadium when Kiwi Brian Fairlie pulled off an upset win over Newcombe in five hard-fought sets. When he went on to face Laver, the gates had to be closed against the huge crowds wanting to get in." In both 1975 and 1976, Fairlie reached the finals of this tournament, losing on both occasions to fellow New Zealander Onny Parun.

In 1976, Fairlie played in an Australian Open match notable for having the 13th oldest combined age in Grand Slam history. His age and the age of Frank Sedgman, his opponent, averaged 37 years, 10 months, and 9 days.

In winning the second of his two singles titles (in Manila, Philippines in 1976), he lost only one set during the entire tournament.

Davis Cup
From 1966 through 1979, he played in 48 Davis Cup matches for New Zealand, winning 13 in singles and seven in doubles.

Team Tennis
In 1974, the inaugural year of World Team Tennis, he became a member of the Philadelphia Freedoms; the team posted the league's best record for the year at 39–5.

Career finals

Singles (2 titles, 4 runner-ups)

Doubles (4 titles, 14 runner-up)

References

External links
 
 
 
 Transcript of 2008 New Zealand House of Representatives proceedings during which Representative Dail Jones reminisced about the matches in Auckland between Fairlie and Onny Parun.

1948 births
Living people
Australian Championships (tennis) junior champions
New Zealand male tennis players
Sportspeople from Christchurch
Grand Slam (tennis) champions in boys' singles